Deadman's Road is a collection of one novel and four novellas by American writer Joe R. Lansdale. It featuring old west zombie slaying, monster fighting Reverend Jedidiah Mercer, including the re-release of the  pulp novel Dead in the West, and four stories, one never before collected, one brand new.

Editions

This book was issued as a trade hardcover and a deluxe slipcased limited edition by Subterranean Press. Both editions have sold out. Cover artwork is by Timothy Truman and the interior artwork is by Glenn Chadbourne It was reissued as a trade paperback by Tachyon Publications on August 1, 2013.

Table of contents
"Introduction: The Reverend Rides Again and Again and Again and Again"
Dead in the West
"Deadman's Road"
"The Gentleman's Hotel"
"The Crawling Sky"
"The Dark Down There"

References

External links
Author's Official Website
Publisher's Website

Short story collections by Joe R. Lansdale
2010 short story collections
Horror short story collections
Subterranean Press books